John Ross (March 11, 1938January 17, 2011) was an American author, poet, freelance journalist, and activist who lived in Mexico and wrote extensively on its leftist political movements.

Life
Born in New York City, Ross attended Bronx High School of Science. Raised in Soho before it was recognized as a neighborhood, he would upon graduating high school become part of the Beat movement. Ross migrated to Mexico in the late 1950s with his wife Norma and youngest daughter Dylan living in Michoacán with his family from 1956 to 1962. He would return to America where Ross would become one of the earliest draft resisters in America during the Vietnam War, for which he served time in federal prison at California's Terminal Island.[1][2] 

Upon his release from prison Ross resumed living in San Francisco before moving to Arcata, California, in the early 70s.                                                                        In the early 90s, Ross would move to Mexico City, where he would dedicate himself to writing.

Ross was the author of ten books during his lifetime, including a gritty portrait of his beloved Mexico City, El Monstruo: Dread and Redemption in Mexico City.

In early 2003 he traveled to Iraq, serving as a "human shield" to help protect Iraqi civilians before the U.S.-led invasion. The volunteers were eventually forced out of the country because they were critical of the Iraqi government's choice of sites to protect.

Ross died in Tzintzuntzan, Michoacán, Mexico, surrounded by his friends and family. Ross is survived by his oldest daughter Dylan, her brother, notable record producer Dante Ross, his youngest daughter Carla and his granddaughters, Honore Ford and Zoe Ross Murray.

Work 
A prolific journalist, Ross wrote many articles for San Francisco newspapers CounterPunch and Pacific News Service, and the Mexico City daily La Jornada. Since 1993, when Ross first broke the story in the Anderson Valley Advertiser, he regularly covered the Zapatista Army of National Liberation (also known as the EZLN or Zapatistas) rebellion in Chiapas, with articles appearing in both English and Spanish language news publications.

Ross covered political corruption in Mexico and the United States, the effects of the North American Free Trade Agreement (NAFTA) on Mexico's subsistence agriculture, the Iraq War, and potential environmental threats from the introduction of genetically modified plants in particular those utilizing genetic use restriction technology. His articles appeared in San Francisco Bay Guardian, The Nation, CounterPunch, The Progressive, La Jornada, and The Rag Blog.

Ross's work reflected a deep and abiding interest in rebel movements like the Zapatistas in southern Chiapas state. He wrote several books about the Zapatistas (the 1995 American Book Award-winning Rebellion from the Roots, The War Against Oblivion, and ¡ZAPATISTAS! Making Another World Possible), as well as a somewhat autobiographical memoir (Murdered by Capitalism), and several chapbooks of poetry. Most recently, he had initiated the publication of Iraqi Girl: Diary of a Teenage Girl in Iraq.

Bibliography

Books
Rebellion from the Roots: Indian Uprising in Chiapas (Common Courage Press: 1995)
Mexico in Focus (Latin America Bureau: 1996) 
We Came to Play: An Anthology of Writings on Basketball (with Qentin R. Hand)(North Atlantic Books: 1996) 
The Annexation of Mexico: From the Aztecs to the IMF (Common Courage Press: 1998) 
Tonatiuh's People: A Novel of the Mexican Cataclysm (Cinco Puntos Press: 1998) 
Mexico in Focus: A Guide to the People, Politics, and Culture (Interlink Publishing Group: 2002) 
The War Against Oblivion: The Zapatista Chronicles (Common Courage Press: 2002) 
Murdered by Capitalism: A Memoir of 150 Years of Life & Death on the American Left (Nation Books: 2004) 
¡ZAPATISTAS! Making Another World Possible: Chronicles of Resistance 2000–2006 (Nation Books: 2007) 
El Monstruo: Dread and Redemption in Mexico City (Nation Books: 2009) 
Rebel Reporting: John Ross Speaks to Independent Journalists (by Norman Stockwell and Cristalyne Bell, editors), Amy Goodman (introduction), Robert W. McChesney (foreword) (Hamilton Books: 2015)

Poetry chapbooks
Jam (Mercury Litho-Bug Press: 1976)
12 Songs of Love and Ecocide (1977)
The Psoriacis of Heartbreak (1979)
The Daily Planet (1981)
Running Out of Coastlines (1983)
Heading South (1986)
Whose Bones (1990)
Jazzmexico (Calaca de Pelón: 1996)
Against Amnesia (Calaca de Pelón: 2002)
Bomba (Calaca de Pelón: 2007)

References

External links
Bio from "Making Another World Possible" Book Tour
John Ross on "El Monstruo: Dread and Redemption in Mexico City" – video report by Democracy Now!
Dreyer, Thorne, "Journalist, Author, and 'Investigative Poet' John Ross (1938-2011)," The Rag Blog, January 18, 2011
Articles by and about John Ross at ''The Rag Blog

1938 births
2011 deaths
American political writers
American male journalists
American anti-war activists
American emigrants to Mexico
Deaths from liver cancer
American Book Award winners